"I Wanna Be with You" is a song by American musician DJ Khaled featuring rappers Nicki Minaj, Future, and Rick Ross. It was released on August2, 2013, by We the Best Music Group, Terror Squad Entertainment, Young Money Entertainment, Cash Money Records, and Republic Records as the second single from Khaled's seventh studio album Suffering from Success (2013). The song was written by the artists and Lee on the Beats, who produced it with Khaled. It peaked at number one on the U.S. Billboard Bubbling Under Hot 100  component chart, representing the twenty-five runner-up songs to the Billboard Hot 100, and reached number 30 on the Billboard Hot R&B/Hip-Hop Songs chart.

Background
On July 25, 2013, DJ Khaled publicly proposed to fellow Cash Money Records labelmate Nicki Minaj through a video uploaded onto the website for television network MTV; he additionally offered her a ten-carat Rafaello & Co. engagement ring, valued at approximately $500,000. He later reaffirmed his proposal during an interview with DJ Felli Fel of Power 106, although Minaj later stated that his offer was not intended to be taken seriously. The same day, Flex premiered Khaled's new single, titled "I Wanna Be with You" which featured Minaj, as well as frequent collaborators Future and Rick Ross. This led some to believe that his proposal was a publicity stunt to promote his new single. Shortly after the song's release, Khaled confirmed it was all a joke and a way to introduce the record.

Music video
On August 9, 2013, the music video for the song was filmed. The video was filmed in Miami, Florida. Ciara was on the set for the music video despite not being featured in the song. The music video premiered on MTV Jams on September3, 2013, and on YouTube on September5. Mack Maine, Birdman, Ace Hood, Jim Jones, Rocko, Juelz Santana, Vado and Cam'ron all make cameo appearances in the video.

Charts

Release history

References

External links

2013 singles
2013 songs
Cash Money Records singles
DJ Khaled songs
Future (rapper) songs
Rick Ross songs
Nicki Minaj songs
Songs written by Rick Ross
Songs written by Nicki Minaj
Music videos directed by Colin Tilley
Songs written by Lee on the Beats
Songs written by DJ Khaled
Songs written by Future (rapper)